Malpas, Cheshire, has many listed buildings; part of the town is in a Conservation area.
There is one building at Grade I, one at Grade II*, two gateways are also Grade II*, and many more buildings are Grade II.

Grade I
Church of Saint Oswald, Church Street

Grade II*
The Old Printing House, Church Street, according to English Heritage, is an 'unusual classical treatment of a small building'. It was built on a sandstone bedrock plinth in 1733. It was listed as Grade II* in 1952. The front gable carries a stone depicting the Cholmondeley Griffin. In the Cheshire volume of The Buildings of England, Nikolaus Pevsner notes it as "dated 1733 but is in the style of the late C17".
Gates, South East corner of Saint Oswald's churchyard
Gates, South West corner of Saint Oswald's churchyard

Grade II

See also

 Listed buildings in Bradley
 Listed buildings in Chorlton
 Listed buildings in Cuddington
 Listed buildings in Hampton

 Listed buildings in Overton
 Listed buildings in Shocklach Oviatt
 Listed buildings in Threapwood
 Listed buildings in Tilston
 Listed buildings in Tushingham cum Grindley
 Listed buildings in Wigland

References

Listed buildings in Cheshire West and Chester
Lists of listed buildings in Cheshire